Schizodon fasciatus is a fish in the family Anostomidae.

Description
Max length : 40.0 cm TL male/unsexed.

Distribution
South America:  upper Amazon River and French Guiana coastal basins.

References

Anostomidae
Taxa named by Johann Baptist von Spix
Taxa_named_by_Louis_Agassiz
Fish described in 1829